Olavi Ouvinen (10 December 1926 – 6 February 1990) was a Finnish boxer. He competed in the men's bantamweight event at the 1948 Summer Olympics.

References

1926 births
1990 deaths
Finnish male boxers
Olympic boxers of Finland
Boxers at the 1948 Summer Olympics
Sportspeople from Vyborg
Bantamweight boxers